Edward A. Vance, FAIA (born May 28, 1957), an American architect, is the principal-in-charge of design and CEO at EV&A Architects, a specialty architecture firm he founded in Las Vegas, Nevada in 2006. Vance has been a registered Architect in 19 states and is certified by the National Council of Architectural Registration Boards (NCARB). He served as the 2019 Chancellor of the American Institute of Architects College of Fellows.

Life and education 
Vance was born in Redfield, South Dakota but spent his school years in Minnesota graduating from Eveleth High in 1975. Vance earned a bachelor of arts degree in 1979 from North Dakota State University, then studied in Western Europe and returned to North Dakota State University where he earned his bachelor of architecture degree in 1981.

Work 
After graduating from North Dakota State University, Vance served as an Intern Architect at Cossutta and Associates Architects, in Dallas TX. In 1987, he was recruited by SH Architects in Las Vegas where he worked as a senior designer for the firm for two years. He was later recruited by JMA Architecture Studios in 1989 where served as principal and finally president before his departure in 2006.

He was elected to AIA’s National Board of Directors in 2010, where he served a three-year term. In 2012, he became a Richard Upjohn Fellow. He was elevated to the AIA College of Fellows in early 2014 and received the AIA Regional Silver Medal in October of the same year, the highest honor bestowed on an architect in a six-state region. Vance is actively registered as an Architect in nine states and is NCARB certified. In 2006, he founded Ed Vance & Associates Architects in Las Vegas.

He is a former adjunct professor at UNLV’s College of Architecture, and continues to guest lecture and provide sketching clinics for students in the program.

Projects

Hospitality
       Thunder Valley Casino Resort
       Magnolia Bluffs Casino
       Island View Casino Resort
       Las Vegas Grand
       Lucky Dragon Casino

Commercial Mixed-Use/Office/Industrial
       World Market Center Las Vegas
The Las Vegas Expo @ World Market Center
       Republic Services North Las Vegas Recycling Center
Credit One Bank Building
Aristocrat Technologies Las Vegas
Two Summerlin Office Building Las Vegas
UNLV Harry Reid Research & Technology Park - Building 1

Publications 
Vance is the author of the books Architectural Sketches, published in 2008., Envisioning Nevada's Future, published in 2019, and Blueprint for Place Making, published in 2020.

Awards 

 AIA Nevada Young Architect Citation - 1998
 AIA Nevada Service Award - 2001
 AIA Nevada Silver Medal - 2006
 North Dakota State University's President's Silver Medal - 2008
 AIA Richard Upjohn Fellow - 2012
 Elected to the AIA College of Fellows - 2014
 AIA Regional Silver Medal - 2014
AIA Nevada Firm of the Year Award - 2020 
AIA College of Fellows Leslie N. Boney "Spirit of Fellowship" Award - 2022

References 

American architects
1957 births
North Dakota State University alumni
Living people
Fellows of the American Institute of Architects